Gold Muchalat Provincial Park is a provincial park in British Columbia, Canada, located between the Gold and Muchalat Rivers.

References

Provincial parks of British Columbia
Northern Vancouver Island
Vancouver Island Ranges
1996 establishments in British Columbia
Protected areas established in 1996